Giovinella Gonthier (January 11, 1949 - May 21, 2012) was a teacher, concierge, diplomat, author, and consultant.

Biography
Gonthier was born in Dar es Salaam, Tanganyika to parents originally from the Seychelles. She graduated from Arusha Secondary School in 1968, Wheaton College (Massachusetts) (Class of 1972, history major) and the Harvard Graduate School of Education (Master's Degree in Teaching, 1973).

When she graduated Harvard, she taught at Seychelles College until 1975.  She married Roger Wilson, whom she had met at Harvard, on March 7, 1975.  When they moved to Chicago, she taught at the University of Chicago Lab School before working as a concierge.

Diplomatic career
When the Seychelles gained their independence from Britain, Gonthier accepted the offer to establish the office of the Permanent Mission of the Republic of Seychelles to the United Nations, and become the Seychelles' Representative to the United Nations. She was ambassador from 1979 to 1987.  From 1983 until 1987, she was also ambassador to the United States.

Publications
Rude Awakenings: Overcoming the Civility Crisis in the Workplace 2002,

References

External links
US still willing to aid Seychelles

People from Dar es Salaam
Wheaton College (Massachusetts) alumni
Harvard Graduate School of Education alumni
Women ambassadors
Seychellois people of French descent
Ambassadors of Seychelles to the United States
Permanent Representatives of Seychelles to the United Nations
1949 births
2012 deaths